Michèle George (born 2 January 1974 in Ostend) is a Paralympic equestrian of Belgium. She won two gold medals at the 2012 Summer Paralympics, a gold and one silver at the 2016 Summer Paralympics, and another two gold medals at the 2020 Summer Paralympics.

Career 
A horse-riding accident caused her to have hemiplegia in her left leg.

She competed at the 2009 European Championship, where she finished second. She competed at the 2010 World Equestrian Games, finishing second She competed at the 2014 FEI World Equestrian Games, winning a gold medal in Individual para-dressage, and freestyle.

References

External links 
 

1974 births
Living people
Belgian female equestrians
Paralympic equestrians of Belgium
Paralympic gold medalists for Belgium
Paralympic silver medalists for Belgium
Paralympic medalists in equestrian
Medalists at the 2012 Summer Paralympics
Medalists at the 2016 Summer Paralympics
Medalists at the 2020 Summer Paralympics
Equestrians at the 2012 Summer Paralympics
Equestrians at the 2016 Summer Paralympics
Equestrians at the 2020 Summer Paralympics
Sportspeople from Ostend